The Battle of Pedum was fought in 338 BC, near Pedum between the Roman Republic and multiple cities in Latium: Tibur, Praeneste, Antium, Aricia, Lanuvium, and Velitrae. The Roman army was led by the consuls Gaius Maenius and Lucius Furius Camillus. The battle resulted in a Roman victory.

Background 
The Romans had campaigned against the combined force at Pedum during the previous year, 339 BC, but the attempt was abandoned by Tiberius Aemilius Mamercus after hearing of the victory of his colleague, Quintus Publilius Philo, elsewhere in Latium. This move angered the senate, and the unfinished battle became the highest priority for the next year.  Therefore, when Maenius and Camillus were elected as consuls, they were ordered to leave at once for Pedum.

Battle 
The forces from Tibur and Praeneste, being the two cities closest to Pedum, had already arrived there, but the forces from Aricia, Lanuvium, and Velitrae had made for the Astura River with the intent of joining the Volscian force from Antium.  They were intercepted and routed by Maenius.  Meanwhile, Camillus set off for Pedum itself, where he engaged the larger armies of Tibur and Praeneste.  Maenius, after having dealt with the armies at the Astura River, came to Pedum in order to assist Camillus, and the two quickly defeated the two remaining armies.

Aftermath 
After the victory at Pedum, the consuls spent the rest of their terms campaigning throughout Latium, effectively bringing an end to the Latin War.  Upon returning to Rome, they were both rewarded with a triumph, and Equestrian statues in the Roman Forum, a rare honor for that time.

References

Sources 

338 BC
Pedum
4th century BC in the Roman Republic
Pedum